The discography of American rapper and singer Travis Scott consists of three studio albums, three mixtapes, two collaborative albums, four extended plays (EP), 40 singles, seven promotional singles, and 43 music videos.

In 2012, Scott signed his first major-label deal with Epic Records, before eventually signing to Kanye West's GOOD Music production wing known as Very G.O.O.D. Beats. In April 2013, it was announced that he signed a recording contract with T.I.'s Grand Hustle imprint. The following years he released the debut mixtape Owl Pharaoh (2013) and the second mixtape Days Before Rodeo (2014). Scott's debut studio album, Rodeo, was released on September 4, 2015. Its lead single, "3500", peaked at number 82 on the US Billboard Hot 100 chart. The album's second single, "Antidote", peaked at number 16 on the Billboard Hot 100, becoming his first top 20. Scott's second studio album, Birds in the Trap Sing McKnight, was released on September 2, 2016. Its lead single, "Pick Up the Phone", peaked at number 43 on the Billboard Hot 100. Scott's third studio album, Astroworld, was released on August 3, 2018. Its lead single, "Butterfly Effect", peaked at number 50 on the Billboard Hot 100. Scott has four number-one singles on the Hot 100, "Sicko Mode", "Highest in the Room", "The Scotts", and "Franchise", in which all songs, except the former were also debuts. His upcoming fourth studio album, Utopia, is yet to be released. Scott has also been featured on multiple hit singles, such as "Zeze" by Kodak Black, "The London" by Young Thug, and "Turks" by Nav and Gunna.

Albums

Studio albums

Collaborative albums

Mixtapes

Extended plays

Singles

As lead artist

As featured artist

Promotional singles

Other charted and certified songs

Guest appearances

Music videos

See also
Travis Scott videography

Notes

References

External links
 
 
 
 Travis Scott at Ukpops

Discographies of American artists
Hip hop discographies